Cyathocline is a genus of flowering plants in the daisy family.

 Species
 Cyathocline jacquemontii Gagnep. - India 
 Cyathocline lutea Law ex Wight - India (Karnataka, Tamil Nadu, Kerala, Maharashtra)
 Cyathocline manilaliana C.P.Raju & R.R.V.Raju - India
 Cyathocline purpurea (Buch.-Ham. ex D.Don) Kuntze - China (Guangdong, Guangxi, Guizhou, Sichuan, Yunnan), Indochina, Bangladesh, Bhutan, India, Nepal

References

Asteraceae genera
Astereae
Inuleae